Prokofiev (also spelled Prokofyev) is a Russian surname. Notable people with the surname include:

Alexander Prokofyev (1900–1971), Soviet poet
  (1942—2007), Russian ballet dancer, teacher and choreographer
Andrey Prokofyev (1959–1989), Soviet athlete
Artem Prokofiev (born 1983), Russian politician
Gabriel Prokofiev (born 1975), England-based composer and music producer.
Georgy Prokofiev (1902–1939), Soviet balloonist
Oleg Prokofiev (1928–1998), Russian artist, sculptor and poet, son of the composer Sergei Prokofiev.
Pavel Prokofiev, birth name of Pavel Prokkonen (1909–1979), Karelian Soviet politician.
Sergei Prokofiev (1891—1953), Russian composer and pianist. 
Sergei Prokofieff (born 1954), Russian anthroposophist
Stanislav Prokofiev (born 1968), Russian economist, rector of Financial University under the Government of the Russian Federation
Stanislav Prokofyev (born 1987), Russian footballer

Russian-language surnames